National Parks and Wildlife Service  may refer to:

 National Parks and Wildlife Service (Ireland)
 National Parks and Wildlife Service South Australia
 National Parks and Wildlife Service (Commonwealth), which was renamed to Australian Nature Conservation Agency in the early 1990s 
 NSW National Parks & Wildlife Service
 Queensland Parks and Wildlife Service
 Tasmania Parks and Wildlife Service

See also
NPWS (disambiguation)